The 2005–06 Tetley's Bitter Rugby Union County Championship was the 106th edition of England's County Championship rugby union club competition. 

Lancashire won their 18th title (beating Gloucestershire's record) after defeating Devon in the final.

Final

See also
 English rugby union system
 Rugby union in England

References

Rugby Union County Championship
County Championship (rugby union) seasons